Ream Naval Base is a facility operated by the Royal Cambodian Navy on the coast of the Gulf of Thailand in the province of Sihanoukville, Cambodia. The base, which covers approximately 190 acres, is located on a peninsula just southeast of the provincial capital, Krong Preah Sihanouk. Since 2010 the base has been the site of annual joint Cambodian-United States training and naval exercises under the Cooperation Afloat Readiness and Training (CARAT) program.

History
With the concentration on ground fighting during the Cambodian Civil War, the government's navy was neglected. At the time of the coup that placed Lon Nol in charge of the government in 1970, the Ream Naval Base was in a very run-down state with one pier in horrible condition, no effective logistical support system and very little internal repair capability. By 1974, Lon Nol's government together with the Khmer National Navy (MNK) and British Royal Navy had vastly improved the base by implementation of a number of actions: procurement of 20 newly constructed radar equipped PCFs (Swift Boats); stationing of four PBRs (River Patrol Boats) in the Kompong Som (Sihanoukville) port area; overhauls of all of the heavy craft in inventory; procurement of a newly overhauled floating drydock the base; substantial upgrade of the Ream Repair Facility equipment; installation of an effective supply support system; and the completion of a modern pier facility and support complex for the base. This newly remodeled and refitted base allowed the Khmer National Navy to effectively assume the patrol and surveillance of the Cambodian coastline which had previously been outsourced to the South Vietnamese Navy (VNN) by the fledgling Khmer Republic. Further plans for an electricity generation plant and procurement of larger, better armed patrol craft were not completed before the fall of the Republic to the Khmer Rouge in 1975.

Since the ouster of the Khmer Rouge in 1979 and the eventual establishment of the current constitutional monarchy, the government in cooperation with its allies has made the facility a relatively modernized naval base currently commanded by Rear Admiral Ouk Seyha, the deputy commander of the Royal Cambodian Navy.

Chinese naval base
In July 2019, The Wall Street Journal revealed that US officials had seen a secret agreement that allowed the Chinese PLA navy exclusive access to about one-third of the Ream naval base for up to 30 years. It would give Beijing a new southern flank on the South China Sea, and only its second overseas naval foothold after a base in Djibouti. Such hosting of foreign armed forces would be against the Cambodian constitution as well as the 1991 Paris Peace Agreements that ended the Cambodian Civil War. The existence of the agreement was denied by Cambodian authorities who called it "fake news". But in 2021, the Cambodian defence minister admitted that China was helping build infrastructure at Ream and continued to maintain that there were no strings attached.

China's alleged presence on Ream Naval Base was condemned by Sam Rainsy, former Leader of the Opposition of Cambodia and the last leader of the Cambodia National Rescue Party before its dissolution by the Supreme Court of Cambodia.  In an article for Foreign Affairs, Rainsy described the Chinese presence as a "grave threat to regional stability" and characterized it as part of an overarching plan by the Chinese government to militarize Cambodia's coast in combination with ambitious infrastructure projects in neighboring Koh Kong Province.

In October 2020, Vice-Admiral Vann Bunlieng said that dredging work was being undertaken around the base, in order to accommodate larger vessels, in a project supported by the Government of China. The expansion is being undertaken by the China Metallurgical Group Corporation. In January 2022, the Asia Maritime Transparency Initiative (AMTI) reported the presence of Chinese clamshell dredgers near the base.

One of two US-funded buildings on the base was demolished in September 2020. The AMTI has also reported China-backed construction activities on the base.

See also
Khmer National Navy
Mayaguez incident
Ream National Park

References

Military of Cambodia
Military history of Cambodia
Naval installations